Dodges Corners is a ghost town in the village of Vernon, Waukesha County, Wisconsin, United States. One notable native was Maybelle Maud Park (1871-1946), a medical doctor and Wisconsin state official.

Notes

Geography of Waukesha County, Wisconsin
Ghost towns in Wisconsin